Even Now EP is the first EP by the American Christian singer-songwriter Natalie LaRue, after she left her band LaRue. It was released on June 19, 2012.

Track listing

References

2012 debut EPs